The Independent Party is a social democratic and Christian humanist political party in Uruguay. The party is led by Pablo Mieres, who was presidential candidate in the 2004 national elections and in 2009.

Ideology
Its goal is to build a third way away from the heterodox left-wing coalition Frente Amplio and the traditional right wing parties Colorado Party and National Party.

History
Founded in 2002 by Pablo Mieres, Mieres left the New Space in aftermath of Rafael Michelini's decision to rejoin Broad Front

2004 election
At the 2004 national elections, it won 1.89% of the popular vote, one seat in the Chamber of Deputies (which is occupied by Iván Posada), and none in the Senate. It is the fourth largest party in Uruguay, and the smallest with parliamentary representation.

2009 election
At the 2009 national elections, it won 2.49% of the popular vote, and two seats in the Chamber of Deputies (occupied by Iván Posada and Daniel Radío).

2014 election
At the 2014 national elections, it won 3.09 of the popular vote. They claimed three seats in the Chamber of Deputies (occupied by Iván Posada, Daniel Radío and Heriberto Sosa), and one seat at the Senate (occupied by Pablo Mieres).

Electoral history

Presidential elections

Chamber of Deputies and Senate elections

External links

La integración de la nueva Cámara de Diputados (año 2009)

2003 establishments in Uruguay
Political parties established in 2003
Political parties in Uruguay
Social democratic parties in Uruguay